

Gmina Boniewo is a rural gmina (administrative district) in Włocławek County, Kuyavian-Pomeranian Voivodeship, in north-central Poland.

Villages
Gmina Boniewo contains the villages and settlements of Anielin, Arciszewo, Bierzyn, Bnin, Boniewo, Boniewo-Kolonia, Czuple, Grójczyk, Grójec, Janowo, Jastrzębiec, Jerzmanowo, Kaniewo, Łączewna, Łąki Markowe, Łąki Wielkie, Łąki Zwiastowe, Lubomin, Lubomin Leśny, Lubomin Rządowy, Michałowo, Mikołajki, Osiecz Mały, Osiecz Wielki, Otmianowo, Paruszewice, Sarnowo, Sieroszewo, Sułkówek, Wólka Paruszewska and Żurawice.

Neighbouring gminas
Gmina Boniewo is bordered by the gminas of Choceń, Chodecz, Izbica Kujawska and Lubraniec.

References
Polish official population figures 2006

Boniewo
Włocławek County